In mathematics, a symbolic language is a language that uses characters or symbols to represent concepts, such as mathematical operations, expressions, and statements, and the entities or operands on which the  operations are performed.

See also
Formal language
Language of mathematics
List of mathematical symbols
Mathematical Alphanumeric Symbols
Mathematical notation
Notation (general)
Symbolic language (other)

References

External links

Mathematical Symbols

Mathematical notation
Writing systems